Battle of Algiers or Algiers expedition may refer to:

 Capture of the Peñón of Algiers (1510), during the Spanish expansion to the Maghreb
 Capture of Algiers (1516), during the Spanish-Ottoman conflict in the Maghreb
 Algiers expedition (1516), during the Spanish-Ottoman conflict in the Maghreb
 Algiers expedition (1519), during the Spanish-Ottoman conflict in the Maghreb
 Capture of Peñón of Algiers (1529), during the Ottoman–Habsburg wars
 Algiers expedition (1541), during the Ottoman–Habsburg wars
 Bombardment of Algiers (1682), during the French-Algerian War 1681–88
 Bombardment of Algiers (1683), during the French-Algerian War 1681–88
 Bombardment of Algiers (1688), during the French-Algerian War 1681–88
 Bombardment of Algiers (1770), during the Danish–Algerian War 1769-72
 Invasion of Algiers (1775), during the Spanish-Algerian war (1775-1785)
 Bombardment of Algiers (1783), during the Spanish-Algerian war 1775-1785
 Bombardment of Algiers (1784), during the Spanish-Algerian war 1775-1785
 Bombardment of Algiers (1816), by an Anglo-Dutch fleet
 Bombardment of Algiers (1824), by a British fleet
 Invasion of Algiers in 1830, during the French conquest of Algeria
 Raid on Algiers (1942), by an Italian fleet during the Second World War
 Attack on Algiers (1942), during the North African campaign of the Second World War
 Battle of Algiers (1956–1957), during the campaign of guerrilla warfare of the Algerian War
The Battle of Algiers, a 1966 film by Gillo Pontecorvo about this event

History of Algiers